The Mozambique national badminton team represents Mozambique in international badminton team competitions. The Mozambican national team is controlled by the Mozambique Badminton Federation (Mozambican Portuguese: Federacao Moçambicana de Badminton) located in Maputo. 

The Mozambican team participated in the 1982 Africa Badminton Championships. Both men's and mixed team reached the semifinals and finished in fourth place while the women's team achieved a bronze medal finish in 3rd place.

Indira Bhikha was the first Mozambican badminton player to win gold at the African Badminton Championships. She won gold in women's singles at the 1984 African Badminton Championships in Dar es Salaam, Tanzania.

Participation in African Badminton Championships

Men's team

Mixed team

Participation in Africa Games 
Mozambique was the host of the 2011 All-Africa Games. This automatically qualified them for the mixed team event. The team were eliminated in the group stages.

Squad 

Male players
Andre Aleluia Tiago
Valter Antonio Jeque
Fausto Armando Mutanhere
Nelson Patricio Fernando Marcolino
Idrisse Issofo Mossagy

Female players
Jessica de Almeida
Maria Macuacua

References

Badminton
National badminton teams
Badminton in Mozambique